Cyprian Godebski (30 October 1835 – 25 November 1909) was a Polish sculptor and from 1870 a professor at the Imperial Academy of Arts in St. Petersburg. He was the grandson of Polish poet and novelist Cyprian Godebski, creator of the "Legions poetry" genre, who had served in Napoleon's Polish Legions.

Cyprian Godebski is remembered for having won the contest for the Adam Mickiewicz Monument in Kraków, but also for having lost that commission to a newcomer, Teodor Rygier, whose more popular design was ultimately adopted by the city in 1889. Godebski, however, created an equally revered Mickiewicz monument in Warsaw, erected 10 years later on Krakowskie Przedmieście, for which he was awarded 50,000 rubles by the Committee to Erect the Adam Mickiewicz Monument (Społeczny Komitet Budowy Pomnika). 
The Warsaw statue was destroyed by the German Nazis during World War II, in 1942, and was recreated in 1955 using the head and a fragment of the torso recovered in Hamburg.

Biography
Godebski received his art education at the Paris studio of sculptor François Jouffroy. He lived and worked in Lwów from 1858 and in 1861 moved to Vienna, where he worked on commissions from the Imperial court of Austro-Hungary. In 1863 Godebski moved to Paris again, and lived alternately in France and in Belgium. In 1870 he accepted the nomination for the professorship at the Russian Academy of Arts and moved to St. Petersburg for several years. He was in Warsaw in 1870 and 1875.

Cyprian married the half-Belgian, half-Russian Zofia Servais, and became the father of Maria Zofia Godebska, later known as pianist Misia Sert who later had considerable influence within Parisian artistic circles. Misia Sert (Godebska) was a friend of Proust, poet Mallarmé, and artists painters Monet and Renoir. Maurice Ravel dedicated several compositions to her. Misia was the business partner and best friend of Serge de Diaghilev. Her mother, a daughter to a noted musician Adrien-François Servais, had died giving birth to her on 30 March 1872 while in Tsarskoye Selo, where Godebski was engaged in reconstruction of the tsarist palace. He married again, to sculptor Matylda Rosen, and while in Warsaw in 1875 ran an artistic salon with her for the local elite. Following his return to Paris, Godebski organized a new popular artistic and literary salon. In 1877, he was nominated as member of the French National Academy, and in 1889 received the medal and title of the Chevalier of the Legion of Honour. From 1897 he was the first president of the Artistic and Literary Club of Paris.

The South-West Brabant Museum in Halle has a collection on his life and work.

Works
 Bust of Gioachino Rossini, Paris (1865). 
 Monument to Independence in Lima, Peru, (1866–1859) 
 Adam Mickiewicz Monument in Warsaw (1898) 
 Allegories and grave statues in Paris, France, to Théophile Gautier and Hector Berlioz at Montmartre and Père-Lachaise
 Statue to Artur Grottger in Lwow
 Monument to Aleksander Fredro in front of Słowacki Theatre near Planty Park in Kraków Old Town 
 Monument to astronomer Nicolaus Copernicus at the Collegium Novum, Kraków University 
 "Genius and Brute Force" 1888, white marble, 2.6 m, state commission, Toulon Musée d'art and Musée Sainte-Croix in Poitiers, France

Notes

References
 Maciej Masłowski: Cyprian Godebski – Listy o sztuce – opracowanie krytyczne, wstęp i komentarze (Cyprian Godebski – Letters of Art – A Critical Analysis, Introduction and Comments), Kraków 1970, ed. Wydawnictwo Literackie (Literary Press).

Further reading
Cyprian Godebski biography at www.culture.pl
Adam Mickiewicz Monument at the Kraków's official website. 
 A Biography for People who influenced Ravel

External links

Polish sculptors
Polish male sculptors
1835 births
1909 deaths
Chevaliers of the Légion d'honneur
People from Cher (department)